Emmett's Mark is a 2002 American thriller film directed by Keith Snyder and starring Scott Wolf, Khandi Alexander, Talia Balsam, Sarah Clarke, John Doman, with Tim Roth and Gabriel Byrne. The film also features Ira Hawkins, Benjamin John Parrillo, Elizabeth Reaser, Carolyn McCormick, Adam LeFevre, and Greg Wood, along with Roundhouse Ron as the Crime Scene Unit movie consultant for the Philadelphia Police Department.

The film is also known under the title Killing Emmett Young. Scenes from the movie were filmed at North Penn High School in Lansdale, PA

Plot
In the Philadelphia police department, Emmett Young is a hotshot, a workaholic newly promoted to homicide. He learns he has a disease that will soon kill him painfully, so he hires a stranger to arrange his own death. With one eye on the calendar (he's allowed a few days' grace before his murder), he pursues a final case, the serial killing of young women. Emmett develops a profile of the assailant. Meanwhile, his fixer hires an ex-cop to kill Emmett, a lonely security guard whom the fixer taunts and belittles.
When he is about to solve his case and he is ready to face his destiny, Emmett is informed that his diagnosis was wrong, and he tries to reach for the fixer he had hired.

References

External links
 

2002 films
2002 thriller films
Films produced by Bradley Fuller
Films scored by Steve Porcaro
Films set in Philadelphia
American thriller films
2000s American films